Leroy A. Young is an American former Negro league shortstop who played in the 1940s.

Young played for the Homestead Grays in 1946. In his four recorded games, he posted two hits and one RBI in 15 plate appearances.

References

External links
 and Seamheads

Year of birth missing
Place of birth missing
Homestead Grays players